Calebe Gonçalves Ferreira da Silva (born 30 April 2000), known as Calebe, is a Brazilian professional footballer who plays as a midfielder for Fortaleza.

Club career
Born in Monte Azul Paulista, Calebe joined São Paulo's youth setup in 2015. He was a member of the U23 Campeonato Brasileiro winning squad in 2018.

In 2019, Calebe joined Atlético Mineiro on loan until February 2021 with an option to buy. He won the 2019 Campeonato Mineiro with the U20s and received praises for his performances in the 2020 Copa São Paulo de Futebol Júnior from club legend Reinaldo.

On 2 September 2020, Calebe was promoted to Atlético's first team on a permanent basis. He made his professional debut exactly two months after, coming off the bench in a 3–0 away loss to Palmeiras in the Série A. On 1 March 2021, he signed a three-year contract with the club. On 7 March, he scored the second goal and assisted the third in a 4–0 Campeonato Mineiro win over Uberlândia, featuring on the scoresheet for the first time in his professional career.

On 8 February 2023, Calebe joined Fortaleza.

Career statistics

Honours
Atlético Mineiro
Campeonato Brasileiro Série A: 2021
Copa do Brasil: 2021
Campeonato Mineiro: 2020, 2021, 2022
Supercopa do Brasil: 2022

References

External links

2000 births
Living people
Footballers from São Paulo (state)
Brazilian footballers
Association football midfielders
Campeonato Brasileiro Série A players
Clube Atlético Mineiro players
Fortaleza Esporte Clube players